Posht-e Chah (also Romanized as Posht-e Chāh; also known as Pas-e Chāh and Poshteh Chāh) is a village in Sadat Mahmudi Rural District, Pataveh District, Dana County, Kohgiluyeh and Boyer-Ahmad Province, Iran. At the 2006 census, its population was 94, in 23 families.

References 

Populated places in Dana County